Heesch can refer to:
 Heesch, Netherlands, a town in the Bernheze municipality;
 Heinrich Heesch (1906–1995), a German mathematician;
 Heesch's problem in mathematics.